Protogamasellopsis is a genus of mites in the family Rhodacaridae. There are about seven described species in Protogamasellopsis.

Species
These seven species belong to the genus Protogamasellopsis:
 Protogamasellopsis corticalis Evans & Purvis, 1987
 Protogamasellopsis dioscorus (Manson, 1972)
 Protogamasellopsis granulosus Karg, 1994
 Protogamasellopsis leptosomae Karg, 1994
 Protogamasellopsis posnaniensis Wisniewski & Hirschmann, 1991
 Protogamasellopsis praeendopodalis Karg, 1994
 Protogamasellopsis transversus Karg, 2000

References

Rhodacaridae